The Health and Social Protection Federation (Santé) is a trade union representing workers in the healthcare and social protection industries in France.

The union was founded in 1979, as a split from the Public Services Federation.  It has grown steadily, having 37,150 members in 1994, and 74,725 in 2019, making it the second largest affiliate of the General Confederation of Labour.

General Secretaries
1979: Yvette Bellamy
1982:
2000s: Nadine Prigent
2011: Nathalie Gamiochipi
2015: Mireille Stivala

External links

References

Healthcare trade unions
Trade unions established in 1979
Trade unions in France